Stella Maris is a 1918 American silent drama film directed by Marshall Neilan, written by Frances Marion and based on William John Locke's 1913 novel of the same name. The film stars Mary Pickford in dual roles as the title character and an orphan servant.

The film was remade in 1925, with Mary Philbin in the title role.

Plot
Stella Maris (Mary Pickford) was born paralyzed and is unable to walk. Her wealthy guardians try to prevent her from being exposed to all the bad that is happening in the world. She is not allowed to leave her room in a London mansion and is bound to her bed. Her door even has a sign on it which says: "All unhappiness and world wisdom leave outside. Those without smiles need not enter." Stella has no idea a war is going on in the world and that there are poor and hungry people.

John Risca (Conway Tearle) is a well-known journalist and a friend of the family. He has been unhappily married to Louise for six years now and frequently visits Stella. John wants Stella to think he is perfect and lies about being unmarried. Louise, meanwhile, wants a servant in her house and hires orphan Unity Blake (also Mary Pickford). Unity is uneducated and has been deprived and mistreated for her entire life. This resulted in her being afraid of everyone.

One night, a drunk Louise orders Unity  to get some groceries. Unity does what she is told and on her way back, the food is stolen by kids. She returns to the home only to be beaten by an outraged Louise. Unity is severely hurt and Louise gets arrested. It is announced she will have to serve three years in prison. John is kinder to Unity and adopts her. Unity is very grateful and falls in love with him. John himself is only interested in Stella. John wishes Unity to be raised at the Blount's residence, but they don't want her. They prevent her from meeting Stella, fearing Stella will notice there are suffering people in the world. They finally convince John to raise Unity at Aunt Gladys' house.

In order to make John fall in love with her, Unity starts to educate herself with Aunt Gladys' help. For the first time, Unity finally feels like she belongs in a loving home and Aunt Gladys is the closest she has to having a caring mother. Meanwhile, Stella gets an operation and is able to walk after three years. She meets John and they fall in love. One day she decides to give John a surprise visit. Louise, who has just been released from jail, opens the door and tells Stella the truth about her marriage. Stella is heartbroken upon learning that he lied to her about his marriage. Feeling betrayed, she tells John to leave her alone and refuses to talk to her family upon seeing how much sadness and pain are in the world.

Meanwhile, Unity uses one of John's suits and pretends he is asking her to marry him. When he comes home heartbroken over losing Stella, she tries to busy herself with work. As she hears Aunt Gladys' concerns about John's inability to be free to love Stella while Louise lives, Unity realizes she and John can never be a couple. At her relatives' home, Stella reconciles with them and comes to the realization that while there will be sadness and pain in the world, there are also joy and happiness that follows it.

At Aunt Gladys' home, Unity shoots Louise in her bed. The next day, at Aunt Gladys' home, John receives a suicide note from Unity. Aunt Gladys convinces Stella's wealthy relatives to give John another chance and not think badly about Unity for she helped free him from his abusive wife. John is reunited with Stella and they get married.

Cast
 Mary Pickford as Miss Stella Maris / Unity Blake
 Ida Waterman as Lady Eleanor Blount, A.K.A. Aunt Julia
 Herbert Standing as Sir Oliver Blount
 Conway Tearle as John Risca
 Marcia Manon as Louise Risca
 Josephine Crowell as Aunt Gladys Linden
 Teddy the Dog as The Mack Sennett Dog (uncredited)
 Lou Conley as The Nurse (uncredited)
 Gustav von Seyffertitz as The Surgeon (uncredited)

Reception
Like many American films of the time, Stella Maris was subject to cuts by city and state film censorship boards. For example, the Chicago Board of Censors required a cut of the shooting by Unity.

Preservation status
Stella Maris still exists with copies preserved at the Mary Pickford Institute for Film Education and the Library of Congress.

DVD release
Stella Maris was released on Region 0 DVD by Milestone Film & Video on April 18, 2000.

References

External links

 
 

1918 films
1918 drama films
Silent American drama films
American silent feature films
American black-and-white films
Famous Players-Lasky films
Films based on British novels
Films directed by Marshall Neilan
Films shot in California
Murder–suicide in films
Films with screenplays by Frances Marion
Articles containing video clips
1910s American films